Mark Pavlovych Padun (born 6 July 1996) is a Ukrainian cyclist, who currently rides for UCI WorldTeam .

Career
In 2017, he won a stage of the Giro Ciclistico d'Italia and after Matija Kvasina, winner of the 2017 Flèche du Sud, tested positive for EPO, Padun's second place was upgraded to first overall.

Bahrain–Merida (2018–2021)
In August 2017, Padun joined  as a stagiaire, and received a regular contract for the next season. In 2018 and 2019, he raced in the Vuelta a España. In 2019, he won the Ukrainian National Time Trial Championships. In October 2020, he raced in the Giro d'Italia and finished in second place on stage 12.

In 2021, Padun won Stages 7 and 8 of the Critérium du Dauphiné, after spending each day in the breakaway, while also collecting enough points to win the mountains classification. By dropping his companions in the breakaway and holding off the group of favorites on two consecutive days, these wins sparked sceptic commentary from riders and staff of other teams. The French newspaper Le Parisien published quotes calling his performance "an absolute disgrace" and that it "reminds us of the dirty 2000s". Despite his strong performance, he was not nominated for the Tour de France by his team, nor was he taken to the Men's individual road race at the delayed 2020 Summer Olympics by his federation, to the surprise of observers. In an interview with L'Équipe, he defended himself against doping suspicions, citing weight problems as reason for his inconsistent performances.

EF Education–EasyPost (since 2022)
Team manager Jonathan Vaughters emphasised his trust in Padun, and justified it with "physiological tests" and "instinct". In February, Padun won stage 4 of O Gran Camiño, his first top ten in a time trial against an international field.

Major results

2014
 1st  Time trial, National Junior Road Championships
 10th Overall Course de la Paix Juniors
2015
 1st  Criterium, National Road Championships
 Giro della Regione Friuli Venezia Giulia
1st  Mountains classification
1st Stage 3
 8th Overall Course de la Paix U23
 9th GP Capodarco
2016
 1st  Time trial, National Under-23 Road Championships
 2nd Giro del Medio Brenta
 3rd Overall Giro della Valle d'Aosta
1st  Mountains classification
1st  Young rider classification
1st Stage 2
2017
 1st  Overall Flèche du Sud
1st  Young rider classification
 1st Trofeo Banca Popolare di Vicenza
 1st GP Capodarco
 5th Overall Giro Ciclistico d'Italia
1st Stage 3
2018
 1st Stage 5 Tour of the Alps
 5th Road race, UCI Under-23 Road World Championships
2019
 1st  Time trial, National Road Championships
 1st  Overall Adriatica Ionica Race
1st  Young rider classification
1st Stage 3
2021
 Critérium du Dauphiné
1st  Mountains classification
1st Stages 7 & 8
 3rd Overall Vuelta a Burgos
2022
 3rd Overall O Gran Camiño
1st Stage 4 (ITT)
  Combativity award Stage 6 Vuelta a España

Grand Tour general classification results timeline

References

External links

1996 births
Living people
Ukrainian male cyclists
Sportspeople from Donetsk